Rise Carr is a place in County Durham, in England. It is situated to the north of the centre of Darlington.

Notable people 
Rise Carr was the birthplace of Manchester United legend Charlie Roberts. Charlie was Manchester United's first England international.

References

Suburbs of Darlington